Henri "Rik" Van Looy (born 20 December 1933 in Grobbendonk) is a Belgian former professional cyclist of the post-war period. Nicknamed the King of the Classics or Emperor of Herentals (after the small Belgian city where he lived), he dominated the classic cycle races in the late 1950s and first half of the ‘60s. 

Van Looy was twice world professional road race champion, and was the first cyclist to win all five 'Monuments': the most prestigious one-day classics – a feat since achieved by just two others (both also Belgians: Roger De Vlaeminck and Eddy Merckx). 

With 379 road victories he's second to Merckx only. He is ninth on the all-time list of Grand Tour stage winners with thirty-seven victories. These numbers could still have risen had he not been the victim of a significant number of falls resulting in serious injuries. Moreover, early in his career he had to compete with the legendary Rik Van Steenbergen, and at the end with Merckx.

Early life 
Rik Van Looy was born in 1933 in Grobbendonk, in the Antwerp Province. As a child, Van Looy was fascinated by cycling. Before the age of 13, he worked as a paper boy. The foundation of his further career was laid in that period, by daily riding on a packed, much too heavy bicycle.

In his very first races as a youngster, however, he did not yet stand out as the big talent.

Career

Amateur years 
Van Looy rose to prominence when he won the Belgian amateur road championship in 1952. He repeated the victory the following year, adding third place in the world title race the same year, before turning professional. He took part in the 1952 Summer Olympics in Helsinki, racing the road race, but without completing it. Instead, he and his teammates won the gold medal in the team road race. At the age of 19, Van Looy won the bronze medal in the World Championship amateur road race in Lugano.

1953-1960 
A powerful sprinter, Van Looy won two races in what was left of his first professional season (1953), and 20 more over the next couple of seasons. In 1956, his victories included Gent–Wevelgem and Paris–Brussels, plus two stages and overall victory in the Tour of the Netherlands. He also won a silver medal in the world road race championship, behind his countryman Rik Van Steenbergen (whom the team was obliged to ride for). 

He repeated his Gent–Wevelgem and Tour of the Netherlands victories in 1957, and in 1958 won the season's opening classic, Milan–San Remo.

1959 saw Van Looy take the early-season Tour of Flanders and the autumn classic, the Giro di Lombardia. In between, he scored another 38 victories, including three stages of the Vuelta a España (finishing third overall and winner of the points competition) and four stages of the Giro d'Italia (for 4th overall).

1961-1966 
In 1960, he scored the first of two consecutive victories in the world road race championship, but Classic victories eluded him. However, he made up for this in 1961, winning both Paris–Roubaix and Liège–Bastogne–Liège – making him the first rider to take all five 'Monuments' – as well as retaining his rainbow world title jersey, and taking three stages, plus the mountains competition, in the Giro.

Van Looy scored two more Classic wins in 1962 (Paris–Roubaix, Tour of Flanders), took another Gent–Wevelgem, and two more Giro stages. At the age of 28, he made his debut in the 1962 Tour de France as one of the major favorites. Van Looy's strategy was to exhaust co-favorites Federico Bahamontes and Jacques Anquetil before the mountain stages started. However, after ten stages in which Van Looy gave a spectacle, he was forced to abandon the Tour due a collision with a motorcyclist. Tour director Jacques Goddet publicly regretted his departure. 

In 1963 Van Looy rode the Tour de France again, taking four stages en route to victory in the points competition and a 10th place on general classification; he also grabbed a silver in the world title race. In the latter race, held in Ronse in his native Belgium, he was beaten in the sprint by his countryman Benoni Beheyt who manually pushed Van Looy aside. Van Looy, starting the sprint too early, did not take this defeat lightly. This race has remained memorable in the history of Belgian cycling.

In 1965, he scored 42 victories including Paris–Roubaix, and eight stages of the Vuelta on his way to his second third place overall (his highest placing in a Grand Tour). For good measure, he also took two stages in the Tour de France.

1966-1970 
During the final years of his career, Van Looy's road performances began to fade, as the new Belgian star Eddy Merckx rose to prominence, but he still grabbed second in the 1967 Paris–Roubaix, won La Flèche Wallonne in 1968, and took a stage of the 1969 Tour de France. His rivalry with Eddy Merckx reached the height of sabotage of Merckx in the world championships in 1969.

Track cycling career 
Van Looy was also a star on the track, winning 12 Six-day races. His first came in Brussels in 1957, his last in Antwerp in 1968. For ten of these victories, he was paired with Dutchman Peter Post.

In the winter of 1956 he was paired with Rik Van Steenbergen for some track races. Events that many looked forward to, but the plans were shelved after they both had arguments during the world championship in Copenhagen. The two Riks would eventually ride together in a few Six-days races in 1963.

Riding style 
Van Looy was a very powerful sprinter, rather heavy for his height due to his muscular legs. In mountain stages, he was usually able to keep up the pace, but less able to make the difference.

Despite his sprint qualities, he usually wanted to avoid the sprint by escaping earlier. Van Looy enjoyed more the cheers of the crowd during solo arrivals. There was no time for that while participating in a sprint and preparing for it.

He could also motivate himself knowing he was being chased by competitors. This is also why he excelled less in individual time trials, it fascinated him less. Yet that shortcoming is hard to reconcile with a man who could ride in the lead for miles without a flinch, visibly hurting his opponents.
The more calculated riding during stage races, was at odds with his attacking style. As a result, he never won the overall classification in a Grand Tour, which also always included time trials. He did win overall victories in shorter stage races (in the 1965 Giro di Sardegna, for example, by winning 5 out of 6 stages...).

Leadership 
Van Looy did not spare himself during preparations for races, which were characterized by spartan training methods combined with a carefully selected diet. 

Gradually, he stood out for his dominant character, both in his team and in the peloton. His leadership was strict, but always fair. Because of him, the term "team captain" was brought to a higher level. He worked out the fledgling leader-domestique system to perfection, and the team had to ride entirely in his service. Instead of the team manager, he himself decided the tactics, which riders were best suited for this and even what they would earn. 

The Flandria-Faema team that was built around Van Looy was nicknamed the Red Brigade by the peloton and public, after the red jerseys the riders wore.

1963 World Championship incident 
The 1963 world championship in Ronse seemed an ideal opportunity to triumph a third time, with a course that suited Van Looy, and this time supported by a home crowd.

The Belgian team would be riding completely for Van Looy, but during the race it turned out that Gilbert Desmet and Behoni Beheyt (both riding for a different brand team than Van Looy) had other plans. At the end of the race, Desmet escaped and Van Looy was forced to start the sprint much earlier than expected, after which Beheyt (pushing away on Van Looy's shoulder) eventually finished first.

The jury only briefly considered the problem of the obviously irregular sprint and did not change the final result. The medals were awarded in front of a rather confused audience, with both Van Looy and Beheyt having a hard time smiling. The story about the Betrayal of Ronse dragged on for a long time in the press and public, and crowds of people showed up at races where both gentlemen would start.

It didn't really seem to bother Van Looy, he enjoyed the commotion that cycling caused. Nevertheless, it is suggested that he systematically thwarted Beheyt's career afterwards. Fact is that the latter already stopped cycling a few years later at the age of 27, also due to injury problems.

The two gentlemen turned out to be on good terms after that, although neither of them ever wanted to talk about the 1963 world championship again in interviews.

Retirement 
On August 22 1970, after a race, Van Looy decided to quit professional cycling immediately and in all discretion. Unlike his predecessor Rik Van Steenbergen, he resolutely refused a lucrative "farewell tour" via criteria and track races. Neither was he interested in a high-paying farewell cycling race in the Antwerp Sports Palace.

Not surprisingly, he subsequently was appointed as team manager for Willem II. Afterwards he became a driver-consultant for a newspaper and magazine during races and in a later phase director of the Flemish cycling school in Herentals, the city of which he is now an honorary citizen.

In his house nothing reminds of his glorious past. "What's past is past. All the trophies, jerseys and medals, ... I've given it all away. To charities, supporters and friends, it means more to them than to me" Van Looy once mentioned.

Personal life 
Rik Van Looy married Nini Mariën in 1955. Both formed a close-knit couple. Nini was partly behind the top career Rik Van Looy was able to build. She was one of the most famous riders' wives in the peloton in the 1950s and 1960s, and put her life entirely at the service of Van Looy's career. 

After a lingering illness, she died in 2021 at the age of 88. By then, Van Looy had already withdrawn from public life for a while to assist her. "She has done so much for me, now it's my turn" Van Looy said.

The couple had a daughter and a son. Van Looy rode on incentives, which could also come from his family. When he lectured his son by saying "when will you come home with good school results again?" the boy's response was "when will you win another classic again?" The following week, the 34-year-old Van Looy won La Flèche Wallonne.

Legacy 
Given the grown internationalization and specialization in cycling nowadays, Rik Van Looy's number of road race victories will likely never be surpassed in the future.

Van Looy is also probably the most popular rider Belgium has ever known. Obviously because of his victories and his attacking way of riding. But his constant accessibility towards supporters, combined with his honest no-nonsense style in interviews contributed even more to this. By communicating in a mixture of Flemish dialect and Dutch, common people could identify with him. This was slightly in contrast to the less language-savvy Eddy Merckx, who hailed from the capital region of Brussels. Even when Merckx's performances began to surpass those of Van Looy, he seemed to have fewer supporters among Belgian cycling fans, compared to Van Looy.

Awards and honours 

 Trophée Edmond Gentil: 1959
 Belgian National Sports Merit Award: 1961
 General Tour de France Combativity Award: 1963
 Stage Combativity Awards (8): 4 in 1963, 1 in 1962, 1964, 1965 and 1966
 Swiss AIOCC Trophy: 1982
 UCI Hall of Fame: 2002
 Memoire du Cyclisme – The Greatest Cyclists: 11th place: 2002
 Sports Personality of the Antwerp province: 2005
 Honorary citizen of Grobbendonk: 2012
 Statue in Herentals: 2017
 GP Rik Van Looy: from 2018
 Bust in Grobbendonk: 2021
 ProcyclingStats – All Time Wins Ranking: 2nd place (162 wins)
 ProCyclingStats – All Time Ranking: 8th place
 CyclingRanking – Overall All Time Ranking: 12th place
 UCI Top 100: 16th place

Records 

 Winner of all 5 Monuments of Cycling (record shared with Eddy Merckx & Roger De Vlaeminck)
 The only winner of all 8 original classics: 5 Monuments + Paris-Tours, Paris-Brussels & La Flèche Wallonne
 Winner of all 3 cobbled classics in one season: 1962 (record shared with Tom Boonen)
 Former record of most races won by a professional cyclist: 379 (1961-1972)

Major results

Road

1952
 1st  Team road race, Olympic Games
 1st  Road race, National Amateur Championships
 1st Omloop der Vlaamse Gewesten Amateurs
 2nd Brussels–Opwijk
1953
 1st  Road race, National Amateur Championships
 1st Ronde van Midden-Nederland
 1st Heistse Pijl
 1st Omloop Het Volk U23
 1st Stage 5 Tour of Austria
 3rd  Road race, UCI World Amateur Championships
1954
 1st Roubaix–Huy
 1st Stage 3a Driedaagse van Antwerpen
 1st Berchem
 2nd Overall Tour of Belgium
1955
 1st Omloop van Oost-Vlaanderen
 2nd Heistse Pijl
 3rd Omloop van Midden-België
1956
 1st  Road race, National Interclubs Championships
 1st  Overall Tour of the Netherlands
1st Stages 3, 4b & 6
 1st Overall Driedaagse van Antwerpen
1st Stages 2a & 2b
 1st Gent–Wevelgem
 1st Paris–Brussels
 1st Scheldeprijs
 1st De Drie Zustersteden
 1st Vijfbergenomloop
 1st GP van Brasschaat
 2nd  Road race, UCI World Championships
 2nd Nationale Sluitingsprijs
 2nd Heistse Pijl
 2nd Omloop van de Fruitstreek
1957
 1st  Overall Tour of the Netherlands
1st Stages 2, 3a, 3b & 6a
 1st Gent–Wevelgem
 1st Scheldeprijs
 1st Coppa Bernocchi
 1st Schaal Sels-Merksem
 1st Omloop van Oost-Vlaanderen
 1st GP Roeselare
 1st GP van Brasschaat
 1st Stage 5 Roma–Napoli–Roma
 Driedaagse van Antwerpen
1st Stages 3a & 3b
 2nd Classica Sarda
 2nd Circuit des Trois Provinces
 2nd Omloop van Midden-België
 3rd Circuit of Houtland
1958
 National Championships
1st  Road race
1st  Interclubs road race
 1st Milan–San Remo
 1st Coppa Bernocchi
 1st Milano-Mantova
 1st Paris–Brussels
 1st GP Stekene
 Vuelta a España
1st Stages 4, 5b, 6, 9 & 10
 Vuelta a Levante
1st Stages 1, 3 (TTT), 4 & 8
 1st Stage 2b Grand Prix Marvan
 2nd Overall Driedaagse van Antwerpen
1st Stage 3
 2nd Gent–Wevelgem
 2nd Omloop Het Volk
 3rd Overall Giro di Sardegna
1st Stage 3
 3rd Paris–Roubaix
 3rd Giro di Sardegna
 3rd Nationale Sluitingsprijs
1959
 1st  Overall Giro di Sardegna
1st Stages 2, 4 & 6
 1st  Overall Vuelta a Levante
1st Stages 2, 6, & 7
 1st  Championship of Flanders
 1st Tour of Flanders
 1st Giro di Lombardia
 1st Paris–Tours
 1st Volta a la Comunitat Valenciana
 1st GP Stad Vilvoorde
 1st Tielt-Antwerpen-Tielt
 3rd Overall Vuelta a España
1st  Points classification
1st Stages 1b, 8, 9 & 11
 3rd Overall Super Prestige Pernod
 4rd Overall Giro d'Italia
1st Stages 1, 5, 11 & 14
1960
 1st  Road race, UCI World Championships
 1st Ronde van Brabant
 Paris–Nice
1st  Points classification
1st Stage 2 (TTT), 5 & 8b
 Giro di Sardegna
1st Stages 4 & 5
 1st Stage 2a Driedaagse van Antwerpen
 2nd Sassari-Cagliari
 2nd Week-end ardennais
 3rd Tour of Flanders
 3rd Critérium des As
 4th Overall Giro d'Italia
1st  Mountains classification
1st Stages 7b, 8 & 11
1961
 1st  Road race, UCI World Championships
 1st  Overall Tour of Belgium
1st Stages 4a & 4b
 1st Overall Week-end ardennais
 Paris–Nice
1st  Points classification
1st Stages 7 & 8
 Giro di Sardegna
1st Stages 2 & 6
 1st Paris–Roubaix
 1st Liège–Bastogne–Liège
 1st Critérium des As
 1st Bol d'Or des Monédières
 1st Heusden Koers
 2nd Milan–San Remo
 3rd Overall Super Prestige Pernod
 7th Overall Giro d'Italia
1st Stages 13, 15 & 17
1962
 1st  Overall Giro di Sardegna
1st Stages 3 & 5b
 Giro d'Italia
1st Stages 9 & 11
 Paris–Nice
1st  Points classification
1st Stages 7b & 9b
 Tour of Belgium
1st  Points classification
1st Stages 3 & 4a (TTT)
 1st Gent–Wevelgem
 1st Tour of Flanders
 1st Paris–Roubaix
 1st Critérium de Boulogne-sur-Mer
 1st Textielprijs Vichte
 1st Memorial Fred De Bruyne
 1st Stage 2b (TTT) Tour de France
 1st Grand Prix du Parisien (TTT)
 2nd Schelde-Dender-Leie
 3rd Eschborn–Frankfurt
 3rd Omloop van Oost-Vlaanderen
1963
 1st  Road race, National Championships
 Combativity award
 1st Boucles de l'Aulne
 1st Omloop der Vlaamse Gewesten
 Critérium du Dauphiné Libéré
1st Stages 2 & 5
 2nd Overall Giro di Sardegna
1st Stage 4
 2nd  Road race, UCI World Championships
 2nd Paris Roubaix
 3rd Overall Paris–Nice
1st  Points classification
1st Stages 1, 4 & 8
 3rd Critérium des As
 10th Overall Tour de France
1st  Points classification
1st Stages 2, 8, 13 & 21
1964
 1st  Overall Paris–Luxembourg
1st Stage 2
 1st Harelbeke-Antwerpen-Harelbeke
 1st Boucles de l'Aulne
 1st Bruxelles–Meulebeke
 1st Textielprijs Vichte
 1st Stage 2 Vuelta a España
 1st Stage 4b Critérium du Dauphiné Libéré
 1st Stage 4 Tour of Belgium
 1st Stage 4 Giro di Sardegna
 2nd Paris–Brussels
 2nd Paris–Tours
 2nd Championship of Flanders
 2nd Ronde van Brabant
 3rd Gent–Wevelgem
1965
 1st  Overall Giro di Sardegna
1st Stages 1, 3, 4, 5 & 6
 1st Harelbeke-Antwerpen-Harelbeke
 1st Paris–Roubaix
 1st Elfstedenronde
 1st Classica Sarda
 1st Bruxelles–Meulebeke
 1st Flèche enghiennoise
 1st GP Ninove
 1st Heusden Koers
 Tour de Luxembourg
1st Stages 1, 2b & 4
 Tour de France
1st Stages 1 & 19
 1st Stage 4b Tour du Sud-Est
 1st Stage 2 Tour of Belgium
 3rd Overall Vuelta a España
1st  Points classification
1st Stages 1, 2, 7, 9, 12, 14, 15 & 17
Held  after Stages 1a & 1b
 3rd Liederkerkse Pijl
1966
 1st Harelbeke-Antwerpen-Harelbeke
 1st Omloop van de Fruitstreek
 1st Stage 4 Paris–Nice
 1st Stage 2 Tour of Belgium
 1st Stage 3 Tour de Luxembourg
 2nd Paris–Tours
 2nd Omloop van Midden-België
 3rd Overall Tour of the Netherlands
1st Stage 2
 3rd Paris-Brussels
1967
 1st Paris–Tours
 1st Omloop van de Fruitstreek
 1st GP Briek Schotte
 1st Stage 5 Tour de France
 1st Stage 2 Giro di Sardegna
 1st Stage 4 Paris–Nice
 1st  Points classification, Tour of Belgium
 2nd Paris–Roubaix
 2nd Circuit of Houtland
 2nd Flèche enghiennoise
 2nd Wezembeek-Oppem
 2nd Trofee Luc Van Biesen
1968
 1st La Flèche Wallonne
 1st Seraing–Aachen–Seraing
 1st Rotheux-Aix-Rotheux
 1st Critérium de Boulogne-sur-Mer
 2nd Flèche enghiennoise
 3rd Championship of Flanders
 3rd Halle–Ingooigem
1969
 1st Stage 4 Tour de France
 1st E3 Prijs Vlaanderen
 1st Omloop van de Grensstreek
 1st Omloop der Zennevallei
 1st Heistse Pijl
 1st GP Briek Schotte
1970
 1st Kessel–Lier

Track

1953
 1st Omnium of Antwerp, 10 Jan
 1st Omnium of Antwerp, 24 Jan
 1st Omnium of Antwerp, 13 Feb
1956
 1st Omnium of Rocourt
 1st Omnium of Brussels
 3rd Six Days of Brussels (with Lucien Acou)
1957
 1st Six Days of Brussels (with Willy Vannitsen)
 1st Omnium of Antwerp
 1st Omnium of Brussels
 1st Omnium of Gent, 29 Sep
 1st Omnium of Gent, 1 Nov
1958
 1st Six Days of Ghent (with Reginald Arnold)
 1st Omnium of Milan
 1st Omnium of Gent
 1st Omnium of Brussels
 1st Omnium of Zürich
1959
 1st Omnium of Gent, 14 Feb
 1st Omnium of Paris
 1st Omnium of Brussels, 15 April
 1st Omnium of Gent, 16 Apr
 1st Omnium of Rocourt
 1st Omnium of Brussels, 31 Oct
 1st Omnium of Gent, 1 Nov
1960
 1st Six Days of Berlin (with Peter Post)
 1st Six Days of Ghent (with Peter Post)
 1st Omnium of Brussels
 2nd Six Days of Brussels (with Peter Post)
 2nd Six Days of Frankfurt (with Peter Post)
1961
 1st Six Days of Antwerp (with Willy Vannitsen & Peter Post)
 1st Six Days of Cologne (with Peter Post)
 1st Six Days of Brussels (with Peter Post)
 1st Six Days of Ghent (with Peter Post)
 1st Omnium of Brussels
 National Championships
2nd Madison (with Edgard Sorgeloos)
2nd Omnium
 2nd Six Days of Berlin (with Peter Post)
 2nd Six Days of Frankfurt (with Peter Post)
 3rd Six Days of Zürich (with Peter Post)
1962
 1st Six Days of Antwerp (with Oscar Plattner & Peter Post)
 1st Six Days of Berlin (with Peter Post)
 1st Six Days of Dortmund (with Peter Post)
 European Championships
2nd  Madison (with Peter Post)
3rd  Derny
 2nd Six Days of Berlin (with Peter Post)
 3rd Six Days of Milan (with Peter Post)
1963
 2nd Six Days of Berlin (with Rik van Steenbergen)
 3rd Six Days of Zürich (with Rik van Steenbergen)
1964
 1st Omnium of Rocourt
 1st Omnium of Ostend
1965
 1st Omnium of Ostend, 30 July
 1st Omnium of Ostend, 12 Aug
 1st Omnium of Rocourt
 1st Omnium of Ostend, 21 Aug
 1st Omnium of Valenciennes
 1st Omnium of Brussels
1968
 1st  Madison (with Patrick Sercu), National Championships
 1st Omnium of Gent, 30 Oct (with Patrick Sercu)
 1st Omnium of Gent, 1 Nov (with Julien Stevens)
 1st Omnium of Gent, 11 Nov
 2nd Six Days of Ghent (with Patrick Sercu)
 2nd Six Days of Antwerp (with Fritz Pfenninger & Peter Post)
1969
 1st  Madison (with Patrick Sercu), National Championships
 1st Six Days of Antwerp (with Peter Post & Patrick Sercu)
1970
 3rd Six Days of Antwerp (with Sigi Renz & Theo Verschueren)
Source

Books 
 Pedalare! The Emperor: The Rik Van Looy Story by David Armstrong in 1971, Kennedy Brothers, 34 p. (English) 
 The Beast, The Emperor and the Milkman by Harry Pearson in 2019, Bloomsbury Publishing, 289 p. (English) 
 Rik Van Looy: De Temperamentvolle Wereldkampioen by Marcel Grosjean & Roger Meuleman in 1960. G.P.V., 40 p. (Dutch)
 Rik Van Looy by Fred De Bruyne in 1963. 42 p. (Dutch)
 Rik Van Looy: Heerser en Verdeler by Louis Clicteur & Lucien Berghmans in 1966, De Steenbok, 222 p. (Dutch)
 Ik, Rik! by Rik van Looy & Rob Jans in 1972, Brito, 95 p. (Dutch)
 Van Looy Story by André Blancke, Jan Cornand & Roger Quick in 1979, Het Volk, 69 p. (Dutch)
 Rik Van Looy: Monument Voor Een Keizer by Roger De Maertelaere, Guy Crasset & Modest Maertens in 2005. De Eecloonaar, 192 p. (Dutch, French) ISBN 9789077562185
 Flandria: de 20 Wondere Jaren van een Wielerploeg by Mark van Hamme in 2007, De Eecloonaar, 392 p. 
 Rik Van Looy 80 by Mark Vanlombeek & Robert Janssens in 2013. Borgerhoff & Lamberigts, 272 p. (Dutch, French) ISBN 9789089313997
 Van Looy / Les Héros! by Robert Janssens in 2018. Kannibaal Books, 120 p. (Dutch, French) ISBN 9789492677402
 ’t Is Rik – Hommage aan de Keizer by Bart Lamers en Thijs Delrue in 2021 (Dutch, French) ISBN 9798201045227

References

External links 

 
 
 

1933 births
Living people
Belgian male cyclists
Belgian Tour de France stage winners
Belgian Vuelta a España stage winners
UCI Road World Champions (elite men)
People from Herentals
Olympic cyclists of Belgium
Cyclists at the 1952 Summer Olympics
Olympic gold medalists for Belgium
Olympic medalists in cycling
Flemish sportspeople
Cyclists from Antwerp Province
People from Grobbendonk
Medalists at the 1952 Summer Olympics